Alexander Foley Martin (January 4, 1901 – December 9, 1923) was a Canadian professional ice hockey player. He played for the Calgary Tigers of the Western Canada Hockey League in the early 1920s. In the beginning of the 1923–24 season, Martin died of blood poisoning during the Tigers' season opening road trip to the Pacific Coast.

He was an older brother of Ron Martin who played two seasons with the New York Americans between 1932–1934.

Playing style
While not a prominent scorer Martin's strong sides to his game included his stick-handling and his defensive hook check technique.

References

External links

1901 births
1923 deaths
Calgary Tigers players
Canadian ice hockey left wingers
Ice hockey people from Alberta
People from Banff, Alberta